The Indian Council of Forestry Research and Education (ICFRE) is an autonomous organisation or governmental agency under the Ministry of Environment and Forests, Government of India. Headquartered in Dehradun, its functions are to conduct forestry research; transfer the technologies developed to the states of India and other user agencies; and to impart forestry education. The council has 9 research institutes and 4 advanced centres to cater to the research needs of different bio-geographical regions. These are located at Dehradun, Shimla, Ranchi, Jorhat, Jabalpur, Jodhpur, Bengaluru, Coimbatore, Prayagraj, Chhindwara, Aizawl, Hyderabad and Agartala.

History 
ICFRE is the largest organisation responsible for forestry research in India. ICFRE was created in 1986, under the Central Ministry of Environment and Forests (India), to direct and manage research and education in forestry sector in India. ICFRE is headed by a Director General with headquarters at Dehradun. ICFRE became an autonomous council under the Ministry in 1991.

Mandate
The mandate of the ICFRE is to organise, direct and manage research and education in the forestry sector, including in cooperation with FORTIP (UNDP/FAO Regional Forest Tree Improvement Project), UNDP and World Bank on economically important species. ICFRE established a National Bureau of Forest Genetic Resources (NBFGR)

Research perspective
 Conservation, protection, regeneration, rehabilitation and sustainable development of natural forest ecosystems.
 Revegetation of barren, waste, marginal and mined lands.
 Research on tree improvement.
 Enhancing productivity of wood and non-wood forest produce per unit of area per unit time by application of scientific and technological methods.
 Research on improved utilisation, recovery and processing of forest produce for value addition and employment generation.
 Ecological rehabilitation of all fragile ecosystems, such as mountains, mangroves, deserts etc.
 Socio-economic and policy research for developing strategies towards attracting people's participation in forest management.

Research institutes

Advanced research centres

See also

 Afforestation
 Air pollution in India
 Central Pollution Control Board
 Communal forests of India
 Conservation reserves and community reserves of India
 Director General of Forests
 Environmental issues in India
 Forest management
 Forest produce (India)
 Forest range officer
 Forest Survey of India
 Indian Forest Act, 1927
 Indian Forest Service
 Indian Institute of Forest Management (IIFM)
 Indira Priyadarshini Vrikshamitra Awards
 Joint Forest Management
 List of forest research institutes
 List of forest research institutes in India
 Reserved forests and protected forests of India
 Social forestry in India
 Tropical rainforests of India
 Urban forestry
 Wildlife Institute of India (WII)
 Wildlife of India
 Rain Forest Research Institute

References

External links
 
 Ministry of Environment and Forests
 India.gov.in/moef
 National Portal of India
 dehradun.nic.in
 Indian Institute of Forest Management

 
.
.
Forest governance
Ministry of Environment, Forest and Climate Change
Organisations based in Dehradun
Research institutes in India
Research institutes established in 1986
1986 establishments in Uttar Pradesh
Nature conservation in India
Environmental organisations based in India
Forestry agencies in India
Forestry research